Bernie Jeffrey (3 September 1933 – 1 December 2021) was an Australian rules footballer who played for the South Melbourne Football Club in the Victorian Football League (VFL).

Notes

External links 

1933 births
2021 deaths
Australian rules footballers from Victoria (Australia)
Sydney Swans players
Royal Australian Navy sailors
Australian military personnel of the Korean War